Legal archaeology is an area of legal scholarship "involving detailed historical reconstruction and analysis of important cases."

While most legal scholars confine their research to published opinions of court cases, legal archaeologists examine the historical and social context in which a court case was decided. These facts may show what social and cultural forces were at work in a particular case. Professors can use legal archaeology to "sensitize students as to how inequality, specifically with regard to race, gender and class affects what occurs throughout the cases they study." A legal archaeologist might also research biographical material on the judges, attorneys, and parties to a court case. Such information might show whether a judge held particular biases in a case, or if one party had superior legal representation that caused the party to prevail in a case.

Notable practitioners of legal archaeology
 Richard Danzig
 Judith Maute
 Debora Threedy
 Joan Vogel

Notes and references

Academic discipline interactions
a
Legal history
Sociology of law
Archaeological sub-disciplines